Michael Randy Page was a Major League Baseball outfielder.

Sources

Major League Baseball outfielders
Atlanta Braves players
Corning Cor-Sox players
Waterloo Hawks (baseball) players
Raleigh Cardinals players
Winston-Salem Red Sox players
York White Roses players
Toronto Maple Leafs (International League) players
Richmond Braves players
Baseball players from South Carolina
1940 births
2021 deaths
People from Woodruff, South Carolina